The Algeria U-17 women's national football team represents Algeria in international women's football for under 17. The team plays its home games at the Omar Hamadi Stadium in Algiers and is coached by Naïma Laouadi. Algeria played its first official competition in the 2018 African U-17 Women's World Cup Qualifying Tournament.

Competitive record

FIFA U-17 Women's World Cup record

African U-17 Cup of Nations for Women record

Arab U-17 Women's Cup

See also
Algeria women's national football team
Algeria women's national under-20 football team

References

 
National
Women's national under-17 association football teams
African women's national under-17 association football team
Arabic women's national under-17 association football teams